Kaffrine (Wolof: Kafrin) is the capital town of Kaffrine Region of Senegal.

Agriculture 

Kaffrine lies in Senegal's Peanut Basin. Peanuts are the second most common crop for the people of Kaffrine, only behind Millet. Both crops are grown by over 90% of farmers in Kaffrine. Maize is the third most popular crop and grown by over 85% of farmers.

Climate Change 

Kaffrine will be heavily affected by the changing climate as erratic rainfall will make current farming practices  difficult and reduce agricultural production.

Infrastructure 

Kaffrine has a station on the Dakar-Niger Railway.

Notable people

Iba Der Thiam, politician and historian
, politician

References 

Communes of Senegal
Regional capitals in Senegal
Populated places in Kaffrine Region

pt:Kaffrine (departamento)